Adult Contemporary is a chart published by Billboard ranking the top-performing songs in the United States in the adult contemporary music (AC) market.  In 2001, eight different songs topped the chart in 52 issues of the magazine, based on weekly airplay data from radio stations compiled by Nielsen Broadcast Data Systems.

In the year's first issue of Billboard the number one song was "The Christmas Shoes" by contemporary Christian music group NewSong, which moved into the top spot that week.  The song spawned a novelization, which in turn was made into a made-for-television film in 2002, but has been included on a number of lists of the worst Christmas songs of all time.  After a single week in the top spot, "The Christmas Shoes" was replaced at number one by "This I Promise You" by NSYNC, which spent 11 consecutive weeks at number one.  After being displaced from the top spot for a week, it returned to number one for one more week, giving it a final total of twelve weeks in the top spot.  This placed it in a tie for the highest total number of weeks spent at number one during 2001 with "There You'll Be" by Faith Hill, which spent the same amount of time at number one split across four spells atop the chart.  Unusually, all of 2001's number ones had multiple spells atop the chart, including British singer Dido's "Thank You", which reached the top spot on four occasions, but spent only a single week at number one each time.

In the fall and winter, two songs which came to be associated with coverage of the September 11 attacks topped the chart.  The first was "Only Time" by Irish musician Enya, which reached the top spot in the issue of Billboard dated September 29.  The song, originally released in 2000, was used in a video paying tribute to the victims of the attacks which went viral on the internet and was featured on television, and it went on to spend six non-consecutive weeks atop the AC chart.  It was replaced at number one in early December by "Hero" by Enrique Iglesias, another song which came to be associated with the aftermath of the attacks.  The song, which Iglesias performed on the America: A Tribute to Heroes telethon on September 21, and which became ubiquitous in the weeks after the attacks as what MTV later called an "impromptu anthem of healing", held the top spot for the final four weeks of the year.

Chart history

See also
2001 in music
List of artists who reached number one on the U.S. Adult Contemporary chart

References

2001
2001 record charts
2001 in American music